The 2011 CCHA Men's Ice Hockey Tournament is the 40th CCHA Men's Ice Hockey Tournament. It was played between March 4 and March 19, 2011 at campus locations and at Joe Louis Arena in Detroit, Michigan. The Miami Redhawks won the tournament and was awarded the Mason Cup. They earned the Central Collegiate Hockey Association's automatic bid to the 2011 NCAA Division I Men's Ice Hockey Tournament.

Format
The tournament features four rounds of play. In the first round the sixth and eleventh, seventh and tenth, and eighth and ninth seeds as determined by the final regular season standings play a best-of-three series, with the winners advancing to the quarterfinals. There, the first seed and lowest-ranked first-round winner, the second seed and second-lowest-ranked first-round winner, the third seed and second-highest-ranked first-round winner, and the fourth seed and the fifth seed play a best-of-three series, with the winners advancing to the semifinals. In the semifinals, the highest and lowest seeds and second-highest and second-lowest seeds play a single game, with the winner advancing to the championship game and the loser advancing to the third-place game. The tournament champion receives an automatic bid to the 2011 NCAA Men's Division I Ice Hockey Tournament.

Regular season standings
Note: GP = Games played; W = Wins; L = Losses; T = Ties; PTS = Points; GF = Goals For; GA = Goals Against

Bracket

Note: * denotes overtime period(s)

First round

(6) Northern Michigan  vs. (11) Bowling Green

(7) Alaska vs. (10) Michigan State

(8) Lake Superior vs. (9) Ohio State

Quarterfinals

(1) Michigan vs. (11) Bowling Green

(2) Notre Dame vs. (8) Lake Superior

(3) Miami vs. (7) Alaska

(4) Western Michigan vs. (5) Ferris State

Semifinals

(1) Michigan vs. (4) Western Michigan

(2) Notre Dame vs. (3) Miami

Third place

(1) Michigan vs. (2) Notre Dame

Championship

(3) Miami vs. (4) Western Michigan

Tournament awards

All-Tournament Team
F Dane Walters (Western Michigan)
F Reilly Smith (Miami)
F Andy Miele* (Miami)
D Danny DeKeyser (Western Michigan)
D Will Weber (Miami)
G Cody Reichard (Miami)
* Most Valuable Player(s)

References

External links
2010 CCHA Men's Ice Hockey Tournament

CCHA Men's Ice Hockey Tournament
CCHA Men's Ice Hockey Tournament